TikGames is a San Mateo, California-based video game developer founded in 2002 by Anatoly Tikhman. The company develops games for digital distribution on Windows PC, Mac OS X, Xbox Live Arcade, PlayStation Network and mobile phones.

Games 
 ZaynMoji - iPhone, Android (2017)
 DurantEmoji - iPhone, Android (2016)
 Scarygirl - PlayStation Network, Xbox Live Arcade, PC (2012)
 Chucky: Wanna Play - PlayStation Network (Cancelled)
 Domino Master — Xbox Live Arcade (2008)
 Monopoly - PC (2008)
 AquaSphere — PC (2008)
 Flower Stand Tycoon — PC (2008)
 Interpol: The Trail of Dr. Chaos — PC, Mac OS X (2007), PlayStation Network, Xbox Live Arcade (2009)
 Waterscape Solitaire: American Falls — PC, Mac OS X (2007)
 Merriam Webster Spell Jam — PC (2007)
 Mahjong Tales: Ancient Wisdom — PC (2007), PlayStation Network (2009)
 Texas Hold 'em — Xbox Live Arcade (2006)
 Flower Shop: Big City Break — PC (2006)
 Wobbly Bobbly — PC (2006)
 Word Cross — PC (2006)
 Sudoku: Latin Squares — PC, Mac OS X (2006)
 Panda Craze — PC, Mobile (2005); DSiWare (2011)
 Tik's Texas Hold — PC (2005)
 Gold Fever — PC, Mobile (2005)
 Fortune Tiles — PC, Mobile (2005)
 Cinema Tycoon — PC, Mobile (2005)
 Rocks N' Rockets — PC, Mobile (2004); DSiWare (2010)
 Cue Master — PC, Mobile (2004)
 Shapo — PC (2004); DSiWare (2011)
 Caterpillar — PC, Mobile (2003)
 SquareOff — PC, Mobile (2003)
 Masks — PC (2003)

References

External links 
 TikGames official website

Video game companies established in 2002
Companies based in San Mateo, California
Video game companies of the United States
Video game development companies
2002 establishments in California